Chalcosyrphus vagabondans is a species of hoverfly in the family Syrphidae.

Distribution
Colombia.

References

Eristalinae
Insects described in 1941
Diptera of South America
Taxa named by Frank Montgomery Hull